Long-chain-fatty-acid—CoA ligase 4 is an enzyme that in humans is encoded by the ACSL4 gene.

The protein encoded by this gene is an isozyme of the long-chain fatty-acid-coenzyme A ligase family. Although differing in substrate specificity, subcellular localization, and tissue distribution, all isozymes of this family convert free long-chain fatty acids into fatty acyl-CoA esters, and thereby play a key role in lipid biosynthesis and fatty acid degradation. This isozyme preferentially utilizes arachidonate as substrate. The absence of this enzyme may contribute to the intellectual disability or Alport syndrome. Alternative splicing of this gene generates 2 transcript variants.

Structure
The ACSL4 gene is located on the X-chromosome, with its specific location being Xq22.3-q23. The gene contains 17 exons. ASCL4 encodes a 74.4 kDa protein, FACL4, which is composed of 670 amino acids; 17 peptides have been observed through mass spectrometry data.

Function
Fatty acid-CoA ligase 4 (FACL4), the protein encoded by the ACSL4 gene, is an acyl-CoA synthetase, which is an essential class of lipid metabolism enzymes, and ACSL4 is distinguished by its preference for arachidonic acid. The enzyme controls the level of this fatty acid in cells; because AA is known to induce apoptosis (cell specific), the enzyme modulates apoptosis. Overexpression of ACSL4 results in a higher rate of arachidonoyl-CoA synthesis, increased 20:4 incorporation into phosphatidylethanolamine, phosphatidylinositol, and triacylglycerol, and reduced cellular levels of unesterified 20:4. Additionally, ACSL4 regulates PGE2 release from human smooth muscle cells. ACSL4 may regulate a number of processes dependent on the release of arachidonic acid-derived lipid mediators in the arterial wall.

Clinical significance

The most common SNP (C to T substitution) in the first intron of the FACL4 gene is associated with altered FA composition of plasma phosphatidylcholines in patients with Metabolic Syndrome.
It has been implicated in many mechanisms of carcinogenesis and neuronal development.

Cancer

In breast cancer, ACSL4 can serve as both a biomarker for and mediator of an aggressive breast cancer phenotype. ACSL4 also is positively correlated with a unique subtype of triple negative breast cancer (TNBC), which is characterized by the absence of androgen receptor (AR) and therefore referred to as quadruple negative breast cancer (QNBC).

The encoded protein FACL4 also plays a role in the growth of hepatic cancer cells. Inhibiting FACL4 leads to inhibition of human liver tumor cells, as marked by an increased level of apoptosis. It has also been suggested that modulation of FACL4 expression/activity is an approach for treatment of hepatic cell carcinoma (HCC).

The FACL4 pathway is also important in colon carcinogenesis; the development of selective inhibitors for FACL4 may be a worthy effort in the prevention and treatment of colon cancer. FACL4 up-regulation appears to occur during the transformation from the cancer from adenoma to adenocarcinoma. Additionally, some colon tumor promoters significantly induced FACL4 expression.

Neuronal development

FACL4 was the gene shown to be involved in nonspecific intellectual disability and fatty-acid metabolism. Since the ASCL4 gene is highly expressed in brain, where it encodes a brain specific isoform, a FACL4 mutation may be an efficient diagnostic tool in intellectually disabled males.  FACL4was discovered to bedeleted in a family with Alport syndrome and elliptocytosis.

Interactions

ACSL4 expression is regulated by SHP2 activity. Additionally, ACSL4 interacts with ACSL3, APP, DSE, ELAVL1, HECW2, MINOS1, PARK2, SPG20, SUMO2, TP53, TUBGCP3, UBC, UBD, and YWHAQ.

References

Further reading

External links
 

Human proteins